Tanya McDowell is an American woman who served five years in prison after a plea deal related to falsifying her residence to change school districts.  McDowell has received national media attention from articles and viral social media posts juxtaposing aspects of her case with Felicity Huffman's 14 day sentence for a federal crime as part of the 2019 college admissions bribery scandal. The misleading nature of some  media attention led to a Snopes fact-checking entry which argued the Huffman and McDowell cases were not directly comparable.

McDowell received a five-year sentence in a plea deal over numerous charges including felony larceny. The larceny charge was for sending her son to a school in a district they did not reside in. She was also arrested and charged for offering drugs and prostitutes to undercover police officers. McDowell was charged with seven counts in total. McDowell had a previous record of bank robbery and weapons crimes.

Prosecutors from the U.S. attorney's office in Boston in Operation Varsity Blues cited McDowell's case as well as five others in their arguments for the length of prison time for convictions in the admissions scandal. Her case has also been cited in discussions of possible barriers to legitimate employment, educational zoning, university admission criteria, and increased oversight and scrutiny in public housing. In June 2011, minister and activist Al Sharpton spoke at a rally in support of McDowell.

References 

American prisoners and detainees
Living people
Year of birth missing (living people)